Francisco Javier Meléndez Villegas (born January 25, 1964) is a Puerto Rican former professional baseball player. A first baseman and outfielder, Melendez played parts of five seasons in the Major League Baseball for the Philadelphia Phillies (1984 and 1986), San Francisco Giants (1987–88), and Baltimore Orioles (1989). After his major league career, he played in the Mexican League from 1991–94.

See also
 List of Major League Baseball players from Puerto Rico

External links

1964 births
Living people
Baltimore Orioles players
Cafeteros de Córdoba players
Canton-Akron Indians players
Colorado Springs Sky Sox players
Diablos Rojos del México players
Philadelphia Phillies players
Major League Baseball players from Puerto Rico
Major League Baseball first basemen
Olmecas de Tabasco players
People from Río Piedras, Puerto Rico
Peninsula Pilots players
Phoenix Firebirds players
Portland Beavers players
Puerto Rican expatriate baseball players in Mexico
Reading Phillies players
Rochester Red Wings players
Rojos del Águila de Veracruz players
San Francisco Giants players
Spartanburg Phillies players